Parkview Medical Center is a private, non-profit teaching hospital located in Pueblo, Colorado. The hospital has 370 licensed beds. In the last year with available data, the hospital had 14,617 admissions, 69,023 emergency department visits, performed 5,963 inpatient surgeries, and 6,657 outpatient surgeries. Parkview Medical Center is accredited by the Commission on Accreditation of Rehabilitation Facilities.

History
Parkview Medical Center was established in 1923.  The hospital is the largest employer in the city of Pueblo, with 3,000+ employees. In 2023, Parkview will become part of the UCHealth network. In 2023, they completed construction of the Parkview Cancer Center, which is a 45,000 s.f. building which includes a state-of-the-art Varian Linear Accelerator and was designed by JDC Architecture &Design.

Graduate medical education
The hospital operates a number of residency and fellowship programs.  Each program is accredited by the Accreditation Council for Graduate Medical Education (ACGME).  Fellowships include pulmonary/critical care, gastroenterology, and cardiology.

References

External links
 Parkview Medical Center homepage

Hospital buildings completed in 1923
Hospitals established in 1923
Hospitals in Colorado
Buildings and structures in Pueblo, Colorado
1923 establishments in Colorado
Trauma centers